Kenneth James Baumgartner (born March 11, 1966) is a Canadian former professional ice hockey left winger who played in the National Hockey League for twelve seasons.

Biography
Baumgartner played junior hockey for the Prince Albert Raiders of the Western Hockey League and minor league hockey for the New Haven Nighthawks of the American Hockey League as well as one season for EHC Chur of the Swiss League. He has a Swiss citizenship and played there as a non-import player. With the Prince Albert Raiders, he was selected to the league's "All-Scholastic Team" in 1984 and won a Memorial Cup in 1985.

Drafted 245th overall by the Buffalo Sabres in the 1985 NHL Entry Draft, Baumgartner made his NHL debut with the Los Angeles Kings during the 1987–88 season. A defenseman until he reached the NHL, he would go on to play for the New York Islanders, Toronto Maple Leafs, Mighty Ducks of Anaheim and the Boston Bruins until his retirement in 2000. Baumgartner's primary role was an enforcer and in his 12 NHL seasons, he tallied 2242 penalty minutes in 696 regular season games. He recorded 13 goals and 41 assists for 54 career points. He is the only player in the history of the NHL to play a full 82 game season and record only 1 point.

Throughout his playing career, Baumgartner attended Long Island's Hofstra University during offseasons, where he earned a degree in business and finance.

In 1994, while still a member of the Maple Leafs, Baumgartner was elected vice president of the NHL Players Association and he played a role in establishing the collective bargaining agreement between the NHLPA and the NHL during the 1994–95 season.

Following his retirement as a player, Baumgartner joined the coaching staff of the Bruins as an assistant coach for the 1999–2000 season, before attending an MBA program through Harvard University. His daughter Alexa was also a player at the East Coast Wizards, having played on both U14 Major and U16 Major teams. She now plays for Bowdoin College's field hockey team.

Career statistics

See also
List of NHL players with 2000 career penalty minutes

References

External links
 

1966 births
Boston Bruins coaches
Boston Bruins players
Buffalo Sabres draft picks
Canadian expatriates in the United States
Canadian ice hockey left wingers
Canadian people of Swiss-German descent
ECH Chur players
Harvard Business School alumni
Ice hockey people from Manitoba
Living people
Los Angeles Kings players
Mighty Ducks of Anaheim players
New Haven Nighthawks players
New York Islanders players
Prince Albert Raiders players
Sportspeople from Flin Flon
Toronto Maple Leafs players
Canadian expatriate ice hockey players in Switzerland
Canadian ice hockey coaches